A Change of Seasons is a 1980 American comedy-drama film directed by Richard Lang. It stars Anthony Hopkins, Shirley MacLaine and Bo Derek. The film was a critical and commercial failure, grossing $7.2 million against its $6 million budget and receiving three nominations at the 1st Golden Raspberry Awards including Worst Actor (Hopkins), Worst Screenplay.

Plot
When fortysomething Karyn Evans discovers her arrogantly self-centered professor husband Adam is having an affair with student Lindsey Rutledge, she retaliates by having a dalliance of her own with young, philosophical campus carpenter Pete Lachappelle. Adam is infuriated when he learns about his wife's new relationship, and she in turn defends her right to enjoy the same carnal pleasures he does. The four decide to share a Vermont ski house, where their efforts to behave like liberal adults are tested by middle-age angst, hurt feelings, and teenager Kasey Evans (played by Mary Beth Hurt who was 34 at the time), who unexpectedly arrives to confront her parents with their outrageous behavior.

Production notes
The film was shot on location in Glenwood Springs, Colorado and Williamstown, Massachusetts.
Hopkins and MacLaine famously did not get along during the filming, and Hopkins said "she was the most obnoxious actress I have ever worked with."

The theme song "Where Do You Catch The Bus For Tomorrow?" was written by Alan and Marilyn Bergman and Henry Mancini and performed by Kenny Rankin.

Originally, Noel Black was hired to direct after producer Martin Ransohoff had seen his film, A Man, a Woman, and a Bank (1979).  Black left the film during shooting due to creative differences. He was replaced by Richard Lang.  Black shot the first half of the film only.

Consenting Adults was the film's working title.

Principal cast
Shirley MacLaine ..... Karyn Evans
Anthony Hopkins ..... Adam Evans
Bo Derek ..... Lindsey Rutledge
Michael Brandon ..... Pete Lachapelle
Mary Beth Hurt ..... Kasey Evans
Edward Winter ..... Steven Rutledge
K Callan ..... Alice Bingham
Rod Colbin ..... Sam Bingham
Steve Eastin ..... Lance
Billy Beck ..... Older Man
Karen Philipp ..... Young Girl
Paul Bryar ..... Man at Table

Critical reception
In his review in The New York Times, Vincent Canby said the film "exhibits no sense of humor and no appreciation for the ridiculous ... the screenplay [is] often dreadful ... the only appealing performance is Miss MacLaine's, and she's too good to be true. A Change of Seasons does prove one thing, though. A farce about characters who've been freed of their conventional obligations quickly becomes aimless."

Variety observed, "It would take the genius of an Ernst Lubitsch to do justice to the incredibly tangled relationships in A Change of Seasons, and director Richard Lang is no Lubitsch. The switching of couples seems arbitrary and mechanical, and more sour than amusing."

TV Guide rates it one out of a possible four stars, adding the film "is as predictable as a long Arctic winter, and just about as interesting ... Marybeth Hurt ... steals what there is of the picture to steal."

Time Out London calls it "kitsch without conviction, schlock without end ... glib trappings ... and witless dialogue sink everything except for the perky intelligence of MacLaine, who clearly deserves better than this."

Awards and nominations
The film had the dubious distinction of garnering three nominations at the first Golden Raspberry Awards.
 Nominated, Worst Actor (Anthony Hopkins)
 Nominated, Worst Song (Where Do You Catch the Bus Tomorrow? by Henry Mancini, Marilyn Bergman, Alan Bergman)
 Nominated, Worst Screenplay (Erich Segal, Ronni Kern, and Fred Segal)

References

External links
 
 
 
 
 

1980 films
1980 comedy-drama films
20th Century Fox films
Films scored by Henry Mancini
American comedy-drama films
Films directed by Richard Lang (director)
Midlife crisis films
1980s English-language films
1980s American films